As a nickname, The Hitman, The Hit Man, or Hitman may refer to:

The Hitman 
 Ricky Hatton (born 1978), English former boxer
 Liam Harrison (kickboxer) (born 1985), English Muay Thai kickboxer
 Thomas Hearns (born 1958), American retired boxer
 Thorsten Hohmann (born 1979), German pool player
 Michael Holt (snooker player) (born 1978), English snooker player
 Paulus Moses (born 1978), Namibian boxer
 Neeshan Prabhoo, Trinidad and Tobago chutney musician
 Bob Sanders, American football player
 Junthy Valenzuela (born 1979), former Philippine Basketball Association player

The Hit Man 

 Don Mattingly, American retired Major League Baseball player and coach and current manager
 Tico Torres (born 1953), American drummer and percussionist for the rock band Bon Jovi

Hitman 
 Bang Si-hyuk (born 1972), South Korean musician
 Bret Hart (born 1957), Canadian professional wrestler
 Chris Harris (safety) (born 1982), American retired National Football League player and current assistant coach
 Don Mattingly, former American baseball player and current coach and manager
 Harrison Smith (born 1989), American football free safety for Minnesota Vikings
 Martin Kampmann (born 1982), Danish MMA fighter
 Mikkel Kessler (born 1979), Danish boxer
 Rohit Sharma (born 1987), Indian cricketer

See also 

 Atieli Pakalani (born 1989), Tongan born rugby union player nicknamed the "Tongan Hitman"
 Michael Norgrove (1981–2013), Zambian born professional boxer nicknamed the "Zambesi Hitman"

Lists of people by nickname